Ang Chan I or Chan Reachea (1486–1566) was a Cambodian king who reigned from 1516 to 1566. He was regarded as one of the most illustrious Cambodian kings of the post-Angkor era. As viceroy, he ruled the region of Phnom Penh and the eastern provinces.

He was ousted by a pretender named Sdach Korn in 1512. He fled to Siam and returned with a Siamese army in 1516. In the same year, he was crowned at Pursat after putting down several rebellions inspired by Neay Kan. He regained the city of Longvek from the Siamese, and built the new capital there. In 1525, Ang Chan used firearms and cannons when attacking Sdach Korn, within 3 months, Ang Chan was able to kill Sdach Korn and his  followers and decapitated him.

Portuguese missionary Gaspar da Cruz visited Longvek in 1556 during Ang Chan's reign and preached the gospel, but in the next year, he had to leave the country disappointedly because most of Cambodians were devout Buddhists and refused to convert to Roman Catholicism.

Since 1547, Siam was at war with Burma. Seizing the opportunity, the Cambodian army launched a counter-offensive. Angkor was regained from the Siamese. In 1553, he was crowned again in Longvek. During the period of 1559–1564, Ang Chan's I army attacked the nearby regions of Ayuttaya.

Early life 

Chan Reachea was born in Chaktomuk in 1486. He was the second son of King Dharma Rechea II, who was the half-brother of Princess Srei Sokuntbot, who reigned in Tuol Basan. Kampong Cham. Chan Reachea, known as Chao Ponhea Chan Reachea, the governor of Chaktomuk district at the age of 24, was forced to leave Chaktomuk by deportation in 1509 to Tep Borei (Khmer border area - Siam is now Bangkok) at the request of Srei Sokuntbot, who dreamed of two dragons flying to bite his royal umbrella, which he thinking as a threat to his throne, the other being a king as  Sdach Korn. The daily life of Chan Reachea in the Khmer-Siamese border area, he disguised himself as a kramak in attracting elephants to the Siamese king, named "Borom Reamea Thipadei II".

In 1512, Sdach Korn raised an army to conquer the capital of Tuol Basan and victoriously expelled Sokuntbot from the capital to set up a fort in Stung Sen district, Kampong Thom province. Srei Sokuntbot send royal message to inform Chan Reachea about the director's revolt and announced the appointment of Chan Reachea as Grand Viceroy to return to help him. The return Chan Reach lent 5,000 Siamese troops with the negotiation of the offering by offering 100 elephants and 5,000 soldiers to the Siamese king.  Chan Reachea arrived in Battambang province, the district chief named "Ponhea Nou" donated 10,000 troops and 100 food carts to Chan Reachea, and he continued his journey to Pursat province and met with the district chief.

The name of Mern Pich, who holds 40,000 troops in "Banteay Mernchey", the arrival of Chan Reachea with the preparation of a military strategy to help "Srei Sokuntbot" late lasted for 2 years, Seeing the late military preparations of Chan Reachea, that is, in 1514 AD, Sdach Korn raised his navy with artillery to attack Stung Sen Fortress, Kampong Thom Province, in the middle of the night and assassinated Srei Sokuntbot. After Sdach Korn was assassinated "Preah Srei Sokuntbot" at Banteay Stung Sen, the five crowns disappeared at the same time, so the official ascension of the director was postponed for two years to wait for the new five crowns. Done  Finally, Sdach Korn officially declared his throne in 1516 AD, which was named "Srei Chetha Thiraj Reamea Thipadei" and it was time for the two dragons to compete for influence as the Chan Reachea King of the Western Empire and King Korn, King of the Eastern Empire, divided the Mekong River into two parts along a stream that lasted a decade (10 years).

Battle at Tuol Basan 

After Srei Chetha ascended the throne in Tuol Basan for three months, Chan Reachea raised 30,000 troops and besieged King Korn from Tuol Basan in 1516 King Korn and his army fled to the east to set up a new fort between Kampong Cham and Prey Veng province in Tbong Khmum district and established a new capital called "Sralop Dountei Pichey Prey Nokor". The first two are equal to (80m) and have a height of 15 cubits, equal to the height (7.5m) and have a total length (2.5 km), which is a strong fortress that is not easy to break. One year after King Korn returned to Chan Reachea and set fire to the capital Tuol Basan in 1517 AD, Chan Reachea and his army withdrew to Banteay Mernchey in the same year. The two opened peace talks, not war, to allow time to gather food and increase the army, which suspended the war for three years until 1520 AD, when the King Korn army launched an attack on Chan Reachea in Kampong Chhnang province.

Battle at Kampong Chhnang 

After the end of the three-year war (1517-1520), King Korn mobilized 120,000 troops and divided them into two divisions, the first division of which was 20,000 led by the chief. "Chao Ponhea Lumpaing" troops to set up strongholds in Samrong Tong district (now Kampong Speu province) and the second division of 30,000 led by the mighty commander of King Korn "Ponhea Kao" to cast  Fortress in Chey Sour village (now Wat Vihear Sour, Kandal province). After gathering a huge army of 20,000 King Korn troops led by General "Chao Ponhea Lumpaing" left Samrong Tong to launch a pre-attack on Chan Reachea in Kampong Chhnang Province. Chan Reacha, named "Oknha Chakrei Keo" and "Oknha Vongsa Akka Reach", led 20,000 troops to fight fiercely with the sound of arrows, swords, spears and artillery roaring throughout the battle of Kampong Chhnang. The help of Chan Reachea, who was hiding in the forest, another 10,000 plus 140 elephant warriors behind the army "Chao Ponhea Lumpeang" of King Korn rushed out to attack the army.  King Korn was defeated and fled to build a fort at Chaktomuk (now Phnom Penh).

Battle at Chaktomuk 

One year after the war in Kampong Chhnang, Chan Reachea ordered two commanders, "Oknha Chakrei Keo" and "Oknha Vongsa Akka Reach", to lead 30,000 troops to attack Chaktomuk Fortress. 10,000 army of King Korn stood guard to protect the area, led by General "Chao Ponhea Lumpaing". Chan Reachea's army, more than twice the number of King Korn's army, defeated the Chaktomuk Battlefield in 1521 AD, and Chan Reachea's army marched on Bati district (now Takeo province). Further, Chan Reachea later announced that all district governors in the Kampuchea Krom area must keep their troops neutral, otherwise he would fight to the death in this war.

Battle on the Four Rivers 
After King Korn know that his nephew "Chao Ponhea Lumpaing" had died in Chaktomuk Fortress by the army of Chan Reachea, he became very angry and sent a wrath to his general "Ponhea Kao" who threw  Troops in Chey Sour village, Kandal province, to mobilize for immediate revenge. In 1522 AD, 30,000 Ponhea Kao troops crossed the river to the west.  The first 15,000 divisions  were infantry led by "Ponhea Sral" and "Javea Viang" and stationed at Boeung Pong Peay north of Phnom Penh, while Ponhea Kao himself led the 2nd Battalion 15,000 with 60 warships stormed the port of Chan Reachea at Chroy Ponlea (now Chroy Changvar) Ponhea Kao's navy was so strong that it chased Chan Reach's navy, led by "Vibol Reach" and "Protous Reach", to Prek Pnov, then Chan Reachea general "Ponhea Mern Pich" who set up a fort in Prek Taten came out to help the "Vibol Reach" and "Prothous Reach" troops. Seeing this, Ponhea Kao also used the trick of losing and retreating so that "Ponhea Mern Pich" could chase after his army.  "Ponhea Sral" and "Javea Viang" embedded in Boeung Pong Peay, north of Phnom Penh fight from behind at the lastly Ponhea Mern Pich was kill in Chatomuk river (now the Ponhea Mern Pich Monastery, also known as Ta Pich, is next to the Royal Monument in front of the Cambodia Royal Palace today) and the Chaktomuk rivers were called "the Bloody river" by people at the locals.

Battle at Kampong Cham (AD 1523) 

After "Ponhea Kao" won the river in front of the four troops, many days without food and tired, decided to set up camp in Kampong Siem district, Kampong Cham province, with only 10,000 troops left. On the other hand, Chan Reachea, who received the news of the death of "Ponhea Mern Pich", was shocked and very sad. He then appointed "Oknha Khleang Moeung" as the Chief of Army Staff, replacing Oknha Khleang Moeung, who was well known for his war tactics and military leadership. In 1523 AD, Chan Reach divided his army into two divisions, the first division led by himself, set out on a battleship named "Saray Andet" and 300 other warships to gather troops in the province  Santuk (now Kampong Thom province) with 55,000 and the second group of 50,000 led by "Duke Khleang Moeung" went out to attack the army "Ponhea Kao" In Kampong Siem district, Kampong Cham province, at the same time.

The news of Chan Reachea's declaration of war reached King Korn. He mobilized the remaining 80,000 troops into five divisions, the first division led by "Ponhea Prom Vieng" with 15,000 as the front line army, the second division led by "Ponhea Penh" has 10,000, the third division led by "Ponhea Nuon" has 10,000 The 4th Brigade led by "Ponhea Tun" has 10,000 as the rearline army and the 5th Brigade led by "Ponhea Phat Sral" and "Ponhea Vibol Reach" has 20,000 with 300 warships as navy to defend the fort in Kampong Siem district, the site of the battle of Kampong Cham. King Korn directly commanded 20,000 royal troops and assigned 20,000 generals "Ponhea Kao" and "Javea Viang" to lead the army, plus the royal army. 40,000 guarding the "Sralop Pichey" fort in Tbong Khmum district (now Tbong Khmum province), the total number of troops defending King Korn's Kampong Siem district was 65,000. Finally, more than 100,000 of Chan Reach's troops attacked the Kampong Siem district fort of Kampong Cham in 1523.

Final War 

After Chan Reachea and Srei Chetha waged a great war on the battlefield of Kampong Siem district, both armies damaged a lot of military equipment, so in 1523 AD, the two kings sent envoys on both sides Purchased cannons from the "Portuguese" in Malacca at the Malay Peninsula, recorded by historians in the 16th century. On the other hand, Chan Reachea ordered 100 artillery pieces and 1,000 pistols  to be kept in the fort, while Srei Chetha ordered 150 artillery pieces and guns 2,000 rifles, a boat carrying 150 artillery pieces and 2,000 rifles were intercepted in Peam district (Dai Viet call: Mangcom) means "Peam Khmer" in Kampuchea Krom and the provincial court sent it to Chan Reachea, so Srei Chetha did not have a weapon to supply the army.

Battle at Tonle Bet (AD 1524) 

In 1524 AD, Chan Reachea raised 135,000 troops divided into four divisions, the first division led by "Ponhea Pheakdey" raised 50,000 troops to intercept The army of "Ponhea Komheng", the father-in-law of King Korn, who was stationed in Siem Poi district (now Siem Pang district, Stung Treng province) with 40,000 could not be brought to help King Korn. The 2nd Battalion led by "Ponhea Tep" raised 40,000 troops to attack the Battle of Tonle Bet in front of the road to "Sralop Pichey" 3rd Battalion led by Chan Reachea 40,000 as auxiliary troops stationed in Kampong Siem district, the 4th Division led by "Oknha Maha Montrei" 5,000 went to hide in Prey Veng province. 40,000 "Ponhea Tep" troops encountered and 20,000 king Korn troops stationed on the closed river. The two armies fought in the morning until the afternoon.  Then the news of the battle in Tonle Bet battlefield reached "Ponhea Kao" who was guarding in "Sralop Pichey" to Help King Korn urgently, leaving "Javea Viang Chum" with 10,000 troops to defend Sralop Pichey fortress. The army of "Ponhea Kao" went to help liberate King Korn in time, the army of "Ponhea Tep" blocked the back road next to King Korn and Ponhea Kao attacked and advanced to Prey Veng province, encountering 5,000 troops of "Oknha Maha Montrei Ben" ambushed in front of Ponhea Kao, seeing this, he told King Korn to go to Sralop Picheay before he was waiting to defend himself with "Duke Ben" and Ponhea Kao threw his spear at "Duke Ben" died at that time and returned to Sralop Pichey fortress, while the army of King Korn's father-in-law" Ponhea Kamheng "was beaten to death by" Ponhea Pheakdey".

Victory of Chan Reachea (AD 1525) 

In the year 1525 AD, Chan Reach raised 140,000 troops to attack the "Sralop Pichey" fortress of Srei Chetha, which had the last guard in the fort of only 40,000 In the battle of Tbong Khmum district, Chan Reachea's army besieged Sralop Pichey for 15 days, as this fort was too high and difficult to attack. A few days later, Srei Chetha died after being beheaded by his brother-in-law, "Doun Keo Officer", Together with Ponhea Kao and all the factions of the 25 top officials to present to Chan Reachea with joy and victory, as promised, he promoted "Doun Keo Officer" as Ponhea Doun Keo as the Governor of Tbong Khmum District. The heads of King Korn and the 25 factions were plugged in front of the fortress of Sralop Picheay.

The First Khmer-Siamese War 

In 1530, after the Siamese dynasty ended the conflict, the new Siamese king named Chakkraphat sent three envoys. The envoy came to ask for an offering from the Khmer King at that time, he replied that the Kingdom of Cambodia is no longer under the control of the Kingdom of Siam, if the King of Siam is not willing to come and test our strength. A year after Cambodia did not send tribute to the Siamese kingdom, in 1531 A.D, the year of the end of the year, the Siamese king raised 50,000 troops through Nakhon Ratchasima to the provincial border. Mahanokor (now Siem Reap Province) Siamese army chief Ponhea Ong Damkhat, the son of the Khmer king Srei Reachea and also a cousin and Chan Reachea, who had lent 5,000 Siamese army. To Chan Reach Chea, he raised his army to invade Cambodia angrily, then Chan Reachea raised 50,000 Longvek troops directly, plus 20,000 troops in Mahanokor A total of 70,000 fought back fiercely against the Siamese army at the Battle of Stung Angkor, and the Siamese army was finally defeated by a humiliation in this great victory. Changed the name of Mahanokor province to the name of Siem Reap province to this day, while the Siamese commander Ponhea Ong Domhat also died by being cut and the sword horn dropped from the elephant's back.

Second Khmer-Siamese War 
In 1549, Siam raised 140,000 troops to invade Cambodia territory for the second time, the Siamese army was divided into two divisions. The first 90,000 led by the Siamese king himself named Chakkraphat came to attack Battambang province and invaded Pursat province, the second division was 50,000 led by the navy By Ponhea Veang San invaded Kampot province. Chan Reachea knew and ordered 60,000 Duke Kralahom Keo Gather troops at Bassac, Preah Trapeang, Kramuon Sar and Bati, Banteay Meas provinces to fight against the Siamese army in Kampot province.

Battle at Pursat (AD 1549) 

In 1549, 90,000 Siamese troops invaded Pursat province, while Khleang Moeung led 40,000 troops to fight the Siamese army for several hours. The Siamese army and armaments were much larger than that of Khleang Moeung. If the battle continued, the army would die, and the duke decided to withdraw his army back to the fort, and the army lost about 20,000 troops. As a result, only 20,000 troops in the fort were starving and besieged by Siamese troops, while Chan Reachea's auxiliaries arrived in Pursat two days later. General Khleang Moeung looked at his army and saw the traumatic face of the army. He thought carefully about this war if this time the Siamese won and captured this Pursat area And Threaten the Longvek Kingdom.

General Moeung devised a plan for his top soldiers to remove 4,000 soldiers from the barracks, disguise them as straw men, and hide them in the forest near the Siamese camp, and then arrange for them to be stranded. Then he sent his soldiers to dig a large pit, 8 cubits deep, 4 squares, equal to 4 meters, 4 squares, put it in the spear quarrel, start pray to eight Deva, put rice, perfume and offerings. He led his family in white dressed, saying he would kill himself to mobilize the ghost army for another seven hours and told all the troops to attack. Out of the siege when he and his family jumped to their deaths. As for the Siamese army, they had to raise their army to fight this afternoon, but because general Khleang Moeung mobilized the ghost army to come and help tonight, the Siam army waited until dusk to bring the army back to attack the camp because the Siamese did not believe that ghost troops came to help, and the Siamese did not know this was Moeung's delay.  In the evening, the Siamese raised troops to encamp around Moeung's army, but there were no Khmer troops, only straw men disguised as soldiers. Fighting from dusk to midnight, 4,000 Khmer straw soldiers hidden in the forest set fire to the Siamese army camp, burning in front and behind the Siamese army Assuming only the Khmer side had auxiliary troops, they also broke up the army.  Oknha Chakrei's army announced that all troops would be killed by the Siamese army at O'Svay Doun Keo, Battambang province, and the Siamese army encamped there two days later after 200,000 troops, including 500 elephants and 5,000 war horse led by Chan Reachea himself arrived in Pursat province to prepare for the war to oust the Siamese army.

Battle at Battambang (Defeat of Siamese army) 

In the same period of 1549 AD, 200,000 troops of Chan Reachea attacked the Siamese army at the Battle of Battambang. Jumped and stabbed the Siamese king to death on the back of an elephant, defeated the Siamese army, the Battle of Battambang, the Longvek army confiscated 90 war elephants, 450 horses, swords, guns, weapons, Cow cart, chariots, and about 10,000 Siamese prisoners of war. A total of 140,000 Siamese troops invaded the Longvek Kingdom, both by land and navy, lost 90,000 and the Siamese army left about 50,000 withdrew to "Ang Seila" on the Khmer-Siamese border. This serious defeat, the Siamese army did not invade Cambodia again, instead it was time for the Longvek army to recapture its territory. Taking the 13 provinces from Siam as well, this great victory, the people nicknamed Chan Reachea: The King of War.

References

1476 births
1566 deaths
16th-century Cambodian monarchs